Robin Freeman (born May 7, 1959) is an American professional golfer. He has played on the PGA Tour, Nationwide Tour, and Champions Tour.

Freeman was born in St. Charles, Missouri. He attended the University of Central Oklahoma and turned professional in 1983.

Freeman began playing on the PGA Tour in 1989 after being medalist at qualifying school in 1988. He has bounced back and forth between the PGA Tour and its developmental tour, the Nationwide Tour. He won twice on the Nationwide Tour, both in 1998. His best finish on the PGA Tour is a T-2 at the 1995 GTE Byron Nelson Classic.

After turning 50 in 2009, Freeman also began playing on the Champions Tour. His best finishes are a pair of T-8s at the 2009 U.S. Senior Open and the 2010 Senior PGA Championship.

Freeman is currently the Director of Golf Instruction at Tahquitz Creek Golf Resort in Palm Springs, California.

Professional wins (2)

Nike Tour wins (2)

Nike Tour playoff record (2–0)

See also
1988 PGA Tour Qualifying School graduates
1991 PGA Tour Qualifying School graduates
1992 PGA Tour Qualifying School graduates
1993 PGA Tour Qualifying School graduates
1998 Nike Tour graduates
1999 PGA Tour Qualifying School graduates
2001 PGA Tour Qualifying School graduates

References

External links

American male golfers
Central Oklahoma Bronchos men's golfers
PGA Tour golfers
PGA Tour Champions golfers
Korn Ferry Tour graduates
Golfers from Missouri
Golfers from California
People from St. Charles, Missouri
People from Coronado, California
1959 births
Living people